John Stratford may refer to:

John de Stratford (died 1348), Archbishop of Canterbury, Treasurer and Chancellor of England
John Stratford (entrepreneur) (c. 1582–c. 1634), Elizabethan and Jacobean merchant and entrepreneur, and significant tobacco grower in the Cotswolds
John Stratford, 1st Earl of Aldborough (c. 1691–1777), Irish MP for Baltinglass 1721–1763
John Stratford, 3rd Earl of Aldborough (c. 1740–1823), Irish MP for Baltinglass 1763–1777 and 1790–1801, and Wicklow County
John Stratford (mayor) (died c. 1501), mayor of Winchester
John Stratford (verderer) (1380–1433), English verderer and landowner

See also
House of Stratford